Bersvend Salbu (born 15 September 1968) is a Norwegian farmer and politician for the Socialist Left Party.

He served as a deputy representative to the Parliament of Norway from Hedmark during the term 2013–2017. He also served as the mayor of Tynset from 2007 to 2015.

References

1968 births
Living people
People from Tynset
University of Oslo alumni
Norwegian University of Science and Technology alumni
Norwegian farmers
Deputy members of the Storting
Socialist Left Party (Norway) politicians
Mayors of places in Hedmark